In enzymology, a methionine racemase is an enzyme that catalyzes the chemical reaction

L-methionine  D-methionine

Hence, this enzyme has one substrate, L-methionine, and one product, D-methionine.

This enzyme belongs to the family of isomerases, specifically those racemases and epimerases acting on amino acids and derivatives.  The systematic name of this enzyme class is methionine racemase. It employs one cofactor, pyridoxal phosphate.

References

 
 

EC 5.1.1
Pyridoxal phosphate enzymes
Enzymes of unknown structure